This article lists the orders and deliveries for the Airbus A350 family, currently produced by Airbus.

Orders and deliveries

Orders and deliveries by type

Orders and deliveries by year

A350 family orders and deliveries by year (cumulative)

 

<noinclude>

Orders and deliveries by customer

Orders and deliveries graph

Operators & entry into service dates

See also
 List of Boeing 787 orders and deliveries

References

A350 orders
350

de:Airbus A350#Tabellarische Auflistung